Robert Barron (born 1959) is an auxiliary bishop of the Roman Catholic Archdiocese of Los Angeles.

Robert Barron may also refer to:

Robert V. Barron (1932–2000), American actor and director
Bob Barron (1928–1991), American NASCAR driver
Robert Barron (locksmith), 18th-century English locksmith

See also
Robert Baron (disambiguation)